is a velodrome located in Toride, Ibaraki, that conducts pari-mutuel keirin racing - one of Japan's four authorized  where gambling is permitted. Its keirin identification number for betting purposes is 23# (23 sharp).

Toride's oval is 400 meters in circumference. A typical keirin race of 2,025 meters consists of five laps around the course.

External links
Toride Keirin home page 
keirin.jp Toride information 

Velodromes in Japan
Toride, Ibaraki
Cycle racing in Japan
Sports venues in Ibaraki Prefecture